Kal Khungestan (also Romanized as Kal Khūngestān) is a village in Seyyedvaliyeddin Rural District, Sardasht District, Dezful County, Khuzestan Province, Iran. At the 2006 census, its population was 44, in 9 families.

References 

Populated places in Dezful County